Reginald I was the second count of the Free County of Burgundy. Born in 986, he was the son of Otto-William, the first count, and Ermentrude de Roucy.

In 1016, Reginald married Alice of Normandy. He succeeded to the county on his father's death in 1026. Reginald was succeeded by his son, William I, on his death in 1057.

Reginald married Alice and had the following children:
William I of Burgundy  
Guy (c. 1025–1069), unsuccessful claimant to the Duchy of Normandy and County of Burgundy
Hugh  (c. 1037 – c. 1086), Viscount of Lons-le-Saunier, sire Montmorot, Navilly and Scey married to Aldeberge Scey. They had a son Montmorot Thibert, founder of the house Montmorot (or Montmoret).
Falcon or Fouques of Burgundy (fate unknown).

References

Sources

986 births
1057 deaths
Anscarids
Counts of Burgundy